George Clement Perkins (August 23, 1839February 26, 1923) was an American businessman and politician. A member of the Republican Party, Perkins served as the 14th Governor of California from 1880 to 1883, and as United States Senator from California from 1893 to 1915. He also served in the California State Senate.

Life and career
Perkins was born in 1839 in Kennebunkport, Maine, the son of Lucinda (Fairfield) and Clement Perkins. Perkins ran away to sea at age twelve, eventually arriving in San Francisco in 1855. After making an unsuccessful effort at staking a mining claim in Butte County, Perkins worked a succession of jobs in Sacramento and the mining town of Oroville, including driving a mule team and working as a store clerk. Perkins eventually bought the Oroville store he clerked at, and was soon grossing $500,000 a year.

Perkins was elected to California State Senate in 1869, representing Butte County. While in serving in the Senate in Sacramento, Perkins met businessman Charles Miner Goodall, with whom Perkins would form what would become the Pacific Coast Steamship Company.

Leaving his Oroville business to be operated by his brother, Perkins moved to San Francisco in 1875 and expanded his interests in the shipping industry.

Perkins sought the Republican nomination for governor in 1879 and ran a successful campaign emphasizing his purported independence from railroad interests given his interests in shipping, a competing industry.

During Perkins' term as governor, former Civil War general John Mansfield served as his lieutenant governor.

Perkins was appointed to the Senate by Governor Henry Markham in 1893 following the death of Leland Stanford. As a Senator, Perkins was a part of the powerful Southern Pacific political machine, commonly called the Southern Pacific Political Bureau, headed by Southern Pacific chief counsel William F. Herrin.

Perkins is buried alongside his wife Ruth Parker Perkins in Mountain View Cemetery in Oakland, California.

Personal life 
Perkins married Ruth Parker, the daughter of his business partner Edward Parker, on May 3, 1864, in Marysville. Born in 1843 in County Cork, Ireland, she immigrated to California with her family at age eight. An avid reader of poetry, Ruth Perkins had several poems of her own published in magazines and newspapers. She died on February 4, 1921, in Oakland, California.

Perkins and his wife Ruth had seven children. Mount Perkins in California is named after him.

References

External links

George Clement Perkins Papers. Yale Collection of Western Americana, Beinecke Rare Book and Manuscript Library.

 

1839 births
1923 deaths
Republican Party California state senators
Republican Party governors of California
People from Kennebunkport, Maine
Republican Party United States senators from California
Burials at Mountain View Cemetery (Oakland, California)